The gemsbok or South African oryx (Oryx gazella) is a large antelope in the genus Oryx. It is native to the extremely dry, arid regions of Southern Africa; notably, the Kalahari and Namib Desert. Some authorities formerly classified the East African oryx (Oryx beisa) as a subspecies.

Name
The Dutch  is further from German  ("chamois"). Although some superficial similarities in appearance (especially in the facial pattern) are noticed, the chamois and the oryx are not closely related.

Description

Gemsbok are light taupe to tan in color, with lighter patches toward the bottom rear of the rump. Their tails are long and black in color. A blackish stripe extends from the chin down the lower edge of the neck, through the juncture of the shoulder and leg along the lower flank of each side to the blackish section of the rear leg. They have muscular necks and shoulders, and their legs have white 'socks' with a black patch on the front of both the front legs, and both sexes have long, straight horns. Comparably, the East African oryx lacks a dark patch at the base of the tail, has less black on the legs (none on the hindlegs), and less black on the lower flanks. One very rare color morph is the "golden oryx", in which the gemsbok's black markings are muted and appear to be golden.

Gemsbok are the largest species in the genus Oryx.

Horns

Gemsbok are widely hunted for their spectacular horns that average  in length.  From a distance, the only outward difference between males and females is their horns, and many hunters mistake females for males each year.  In males horns tend to be thicker with larger bases.  Females have slightly longer, thinner horns.

Female gemsbok use their horns to defend themselves and their offspring from predators, while males primarily use their horns to defend their territories from other males.

Gemsbok are one of the few antelope species where female trophies are sometimes more desirable than male ones. A gemsbok horn can be fashioned into a natural trumpet and, according to some authorities, can be used as a shofar.

Ecology and biology

Gemsbok live in herds of about 10–40 animals, which consist of a dominant male, a few nondominant males, and females. They are mainly desert-dwelling and do not depend on drinking water to supply their physiological needs. Gemsbok are mostly crepuscular in nature, since temperatures are tolerable and predator detection rates are highest during these times.

Diet

The gemsbok is generally a grazer but changes to browsing during the dry season or when grass is sparse. It may dig up to a meter deep to find roots and tubers, supplementing its water intake by eating wild tsamma melons and cucumbers, which can provide all the water required (3 liters per 100 kg bodyweight and day).

Reproduction

The gemsbok is polygynous, with one resident male mating with the receptive females in the herd. The male is known to secure exclusive mating access to the females by attempting to herd mixed or nursery herds onto his territory. The gemsbok has no specified breeding season, but the young in a given herd tend to be of a similar age due to reproductive synchrony between females. Pregnant females leave the herd before giving birth. The gestation period lasts 270 days and mothers give birth to 1-2 offspring. The calf remains hidden 6 weeks after birth, after which mother and calf rejoin the herd. The calf is weaned at 3.5 months, becomes independent at 4.5 month, and achieves sexual maturity at 1.5–2 years in both sexes.

Introduction to North America
In 1969, the New Mexico State Department of Game and Fish decided to introduce gemsbok to the Tularosa Basin, New Mexico, in the United States. Ninety-three were released from 1969 to 1977, with the current population estimated to be around 3,000 individuals. Gradually expanding their range from Tularosa Basin towards the west and northwest, an unknown number of animals are now also established in the San Andres National Wildlife Refuge, the Jornada Biosphere Reserve as well as the endorheic drainage basins east of Caballo Mountains, especially where these are traversed by the Jornada del Muerto trail north of Upham.

Potential invasive status
As they are capable of year-round breeding, the transplanted population thrives in the presence of absence of their natural predators, such as the lion (Panthera leo), spotted hyena (Crocuta crocuta) cheetah (Acinonyx jubatus) and leopard (Panthera pardus). Except for calves, the oryx is too large to be preyed on by the coyote (Canis latrans) and most other major American desert carnivores, since the jaguar (Panthera onca) is mostly extirpated from the state, and the reintroduced Mexican wolf (Canis lupus baileyi) is too low in population numbers (and all known Mexican wolf populations are over 100 miles away). The species is therefore primarily managed by regulated hunting. However, the only North American predator that regularly takes gemsbok is the cougar (Puma concolor); for only one individual, 29 gemsbok were hunted, with the species making up 58% of recorded kills (most consisting of newborns, but some adults were also shown to have been killed). New Mexico gemsbok seem to prefer undisturbed grasslands for feeding, putting pressure on grassland ecosystems already threatened by climate change and encroachment by shrubs. This fact, along with their larger size and potentially dangerous horns, may cause them to outcompete with and/or put pressure on not only local livestock operations, but native desert herbivores, such as the pronghorn (Antilocapra americana) and the mule deer (Odocoileus hemionus). In addition, gemsbok may spread disease to fellow bovids like the desert bighorn sheep (Ovis canadensis nelsoni).

Significance to humans
The gemsbok is depicted on the coat of arms of Namibia, where the current population of the species is estimated at 373,000 individuals. In the town of Oranjemund, resident gemsbok wander freely around the streets, taking advantage of the vegetation in the town, such as the grass in parks, road medians, and browsing on low branches of the many trees.

References

External links

Animal Diversity Web's article on the gemsbok

Herbivorous mammals
Mammals described in 1758
Mammals of Botswana
Mammals of Namibia
Mammals of South Africa
Mammals of Southern Africa
Mammals of Zimbabwe
Oryx
Taxa named by Carl Linnaeus